David Rodela (born July 15, 1982) is an American professional boxer.

Amateur career
Rodela was the 2004 U.S. National Lightweight Champion.

Professional career
Rodela is trained by Freddie Roach. He is also the main sparring partner of Jose Benavidez, Manny Pacquiao and Amir Khan. On March 26, 2010 he lost by 3rd round T.K.O to top Junior Lightweight prospect, Mexican Dante Jardon.

Professional boxing record 

| style="text-align:center;" colspan="8"|17 wins (7 knockouts, 10 decisions), 13 losses, 3 draws
|-  style="text-align:center; background:#e3e3e3;"
|  style="border-style:none none solid solid; "|Res.
|  style="border-style:none none solid solid; "|Record
|  style="border-style:none none solid solid; "|Opponent
|  style="border-style:none none solid solid; "|Type
|  style="border-style:none none solid solid; "|Rd., Time
|  style="border-style:none none solid solid; "|Date
|  style="border-style:none none solid solid; "|Location
|  style="border-style:none none solid solid; "|Notes
|- align=center
|Loss
|17-13-3
|align=left| Christian Gonzalez
|
|
|
|align=left|
|align=left|
|- align=center
|Loss
|17-12-3
|align=left| Marcelino Nicolas Lopez
|
|
|
|align=left|
|align=left|
|- align=center
|Loss
|17-11-3
|align=left| Zachary Ochoa
|
|
|
|align=left|
|align=left|
|- align=center
|Loss
|17-10-3
|align=left| Jose Carlos Ramirez
|
|
|
|align=left|
|align=left|
|- align=center
|Win
|17-9-3
|align=left| Tyrell Samuel
| 
|
|
|align=left|
|align=left|
|- align=center
|Loss
|16-9-3
|align=left| Stan Martyniouk
| 
|
|
|align=left|
|align=left|
|- align=center
|Loss
|16-8-3
|align=left| Jorge Linares
| 
|
|
|align=left|
|align=left|
|- align=center
|Loss
|16-7-3
|align=left| Ronny Rios
| 
|
|
|align=left|
|align=left|
|- align=center
|Loss
|16-6-3
|align=left| Terence Crawford
| 
|
|
|align=left|
|align=left|
|- align=center
|Win
|16-5-3
|align=left| Baudel Cardenas
| 
|
|
|align=left|
|align=left|
|- align=center
|}

References

External links
David Rodela on Myspace

American people of Mexican descent
Boxers from California
Super-featherweight boxers
1982 births
Living people
American male boxers